The American Standard of Perfection is the official breed standard for the poultry fancy in North America. First published in 1874 by the American Poultry Association, the Standard of Perfection (commonly referred to as "the Standard") classifies and describes the standard physical appearance, coloring and temperament for all recognized breeds of poultry, including chickens, ducks, turkeys, and geese.  The current edition was published in 2015.

Use
The Standard is used by American Poultry Association judges at sanctioned poultry shows to judge poultry, and by those who participate in the competitive showing of selectively bred birds that conform to the standard, which led to the term "standard bred" poultry.

History
The first edition of the book listed 41 breeds, and today's versions have nearly 60. There are 19 classes of poultry recognized by the American Poultry Association. Eleven of these classes are devoted to chickens, of which six are classes of large breeds and five are bantam classes. There are four classes of ducks and three classes of geese, both divided by weight. All breeds of turkeys are grouped into one class.

List of American Poultry Association Classes
Standard: American, Asiatic, Continental, English, Mediterranean, and All Other Standard Breeds 

Bantam: Single Comb Clean Legged (SCCL), Rose Comb Clean Legged (RCCL), All Other Comb Clean Legged (AOCCL), Feather Legged, and Game Bantam

Ducks: Heavy, Medium, Light, and Bantam

Geese: Heavy, Medium, and Light

Turkeys: Judged as one class.

Guinea Fowl: Judged as one class.

See also
 List of chicken breeds
 List of goose breeds
 List of duck breeds
 List of turkey breeds

References

External links
  The American Standard of Perfection, full 1905 version from Google Books

Handbooks and manuals
Animal breeding standards
Poultry standards